The Battles of Batočina and Jagodina were several battles fought between 23 and 27 March 1804 in Batočina and Jagodina (central Serbia) between the Serbian Revolutionaries under Karađorđe and the Dahije (renegade Janissaries) under Kučuk-Alija.

Battle
After a succession of violent battles, Kučuk-Alija's forces were surrounded and defeated in both Batočina and Jagodina.

References

Batocina, Jagodina
Batocina, Jagodina
Military history of Serbia
First Serbian Uprising
Conflicts in 1804
1804 in the Ottoman Empire
1804 in Serbia
1804 in Europe
Batočina
Jagodina
March 1804 events